Ian Grant may refer to:
 Ian Grant (physicist) (born 1930), British physicist 
 Ian David Grant (1943–2022), chairman and First Commissioner of the Crown Estate
 Ian F. Grant (born 1940), New Zealand historian, writer, editor and publisher
 Ian Lyall Grant (1915–2020), British army officer, engineer and government official

See also
 Iain Hamilton Grant, British philosopher